Shangcheng Road is a station on Shanghai Metro Line 9. It began operation on December 31, 2009. It is located at the intersection of South Pudong Road and Shangcheng Road.

Railway stations in Shanghai
Shanghai Metro stations in Pudong
Railway stations in China opened in 2009
Line 9, Shanghai Metro